Hunteria umbellata grows as either a shrub or small tree up to  tall, with a trunk diameter of up to . Its flowers feature a white, creamy or pale yellow corolla. The fruit is yellow and smooth. Its habitat is forests from sea level to  altitude. Its numerous local medicinal uses include for fever, leprosy sores, stomach and liver problems and as an anthelmintic, especially against internal worms. Hunteria umbellata has been used as arrow poison. The plant's hard wood is used in carving and to make small tools. The species is native to an area of tropical Africa from Guinea-Bissau in the west to Angola in the south.

References

umbellata
Plants used in traditional African medicine
Flora of Angola
Flora of West Tropical Africa
Flora of West-Central Tropical Africa
Plants described in 1896